The WR postcode area, also known as the Worcester postcode area, is a group of fifteen postcode districts in England, within seven post towns. These cover central and southern Worcestershire (including Worcester, Broadway, Droitwich, Evesham, Malvern, Pershore and Tenbury Wells), plus very small parts of Herefordshire, Shropshire, Warwickshire and Gloucestershire.



Coverage
The approximate coverage of the postcode districts:

|-
! WR1
| WORCESTER
| Worcester
| Worcester
|-
! WR2
| WORCESTER
| Powick, Hallow
| Worcester, Malvern Hills
|-
! WR3
| WORCESTER
| Fernhill Heath, Claines
| Worcester, Wychavon
|-
! WR4
| WORCESTER
| Warndon, Long Meadow
| Worcester, Wychavon
|-
! WR5
| WORCESTER
| Kempsey, Broomhall
| Worcester, Wychavon, Malvern Hills
|-
! WR6
| WORCESTER
| Martley, Clifton on Teme, Abberley
| Malvern Hills, Herefordshire
|-
! WR7
| WORCESTER
| Inkberrow, Crowle, Upton Snodsbury
| Wychavon
|-
! WR8
| WORCESTER
| Upton upon Severn, Hanley Castle, Hanley Swan
| Malvern Hills, Wychavon
|-
! WR9
| DROITWICH
| Droitwich, Ombersley, Wychbold, Rushock
| Wychavon, Wyre Forest
|-
! WR10
| PERSHORE
| Pershore, Eckington, Drakes Broughton
| Wychavon
|-
! style="background:#FFFFFF;"|WR11
| style="background:#FFFFFF;"|BROADWAY
| style="background:#FFFFFF;"|
| style="background:#FFFFFF;"|non-geographic
|-
! WR11
| EVESHAM
| Evesham, Harvington, Badsey
| Wychavon, Stratford-on-Avon, Tewkesbury, Cotswold
|-
! WR12
| BROADWAY
| Broadway, Willersey, Childswickham
| Wychavon, Tewkesbury, Cotswold
|-
! WR13
| MALVERN
| Colwall, Cradley, Welland
| Malvern Hills, Herefordshire, Forest of Dean
|-
! WR14
| MALVERN
| Malvern, Upper Welland
| Malvern Hills, Herefordshire
|-
! WR15
| TENBURY WELLS
| Tenbury Wells, Burford, Newnham Bridge
| Malvern Hills, Shropshire, Herefordshire
|-
! style="background:#FFFFFF;"|WR78
| style="background:#FFFFFF;"|WORCESTER
| style="background:#FFFFFF;"|Kays Ltd
| style="background:#FFFFFF;"|non-geographic
|-
! style="background:#FFFFFF;"|WR99
| style="background:#FFFFFF;"|WORCESTER
| style="background:#FFFFFF;"|Kays Ltd
| style="background:#FFFFFF;"|non-geographic
|}

Map

See also
Postcode Address File
List of postcode areas in the United Kingdom

References

External links
 Royal Mail's Postcode Address File
A quick introduction to Royal Mail's Postcode Address File (PAF)

Geography of Worcester, England
Droitwich Spa
Postcode areas covering the West Midlands (region)